The Best American Travel Writing was a yearly anthology of travel literature published in United States magazines.  It was started in 2000 as part of The Best American Series published by Houghton Mifflin. Essays were chosen using the same procedure as other titles in the Best American series; the series editor chose about 100 article candidates, from which the guest editor picked 25 or so for publication; the remaining runner-up articles were listed in the appendix. 

Jason Wilson was the series editor from its inception in 2000 to its final edition in 2021.

Guest editors
 2000: Bill Bryson
 2001: Paul Theroux
 2002: Frances Mayes
 2003: Ian Frazier
 2004: Pico Iyer
 2005: Jamaica Kincaid
 2006: Tim Cahill
 2007: Susan Orlean
 2008: Anthony Bourdain
 2009: Simon Winchester
 2010: Bill Buford
 2011: Sloane Crosley
 2012: William Vollmann
 2013: Elizabeth Gilbert
 2014: Paul Theroux
 2015: Andrew McCarthy
 2016: Bill Bryson
 2017: Lauren Collins
 2018: Cheryl Strayed
 2019: Alexandra Fuller
 2020: Robert Macfarlane
 2021: Padma Lakshmi

References

Book series introduced in 2000
Travel Writing
Publications established in 2000
Houghton Mifflin books
Travel books